Saint-Laurent-de-Cerdans is a commune in the Pyrénées-Orientales department in southern France.

Geography 
Saint-Laurent-de-Cerdans is located in the canton of Le Canigou and in the arrondissement of Céret.

Government and politics

Mayors

Population

See also
Communes of the Pyrénées-Orientales department

References

Communes of Pyrénées-Orientales